"Goodbye Baby" is a song written and performed by Jack Scott featuring The Chantones Vocal Group. The song was featured on his 1958 album, Jack Scott.

Chart performance
It reached #8 on the U.S. pop chart in 1959.  The B-side to Scott's version, "Save My Soul", reached #73 in the U.S. pop chart in 1959.

The song ranked #79 on Billboard magazine's Top 100 songs of 1959.

Other versions
The Howard Morrison Quartet released a version of the song as a single in 1959, but it did not chart.
Robert Gordon released a version of the song on his 1994 album All for the Love of Rock 'N' Roll.

References

1958 songs
1958 singles
1959 singles
Songs written by Jack Scott (singer)